William Thomas "Mox" McQuery (June 28, 1861 – June 12, 1900) was a Major League Baseball first baseman. He played for the Cincinnati Outlaw Reds (1884) of the Union Association, the Detroit Wolverines (1885) and the Kansas City Cowboys (1886), both of the National League, and the Syracuse Stars (1890) and Washington Statesmen (1891), both of the American Association. He was a native of Garrard County, Kentucky.
   
On September 28, 1885 he became the second Wolverine (after George Wood) to hit for the cycle, in a 14–2 Detroit win against the Providence Grays at Recreation Park.

In the 1890 season, he finished second on his team and tenth in the league with a .308 batting average. He also had career highs in nine other offensive categories. His career totals include 417 games played, 429 hits, 13 home runs, 160 RBI, 231 runs scored, and a lifetime batting average of .271.

McQuery was a patrol officer for the Covington Police Department when he was killed in the line of duty. He had stopped a horse-drawn streetcar that contained two men wanted for murder. The criminals opened fire, striking him in the chest, and he later died as result of his injuries. "Big Mox" was buried at Linden Grove Cemetery in Covington, Kentucky.

See also
 List of Major League Baseball players to hit for the cycle

References

External links
, or Retrosheet

1861 births
1900 deaths
1900 murders in the United States
19th-century baseball players
Major League Baseball first basemen
Cincinnati Outlaw Reds players
Detroit Wolverines players
Kansas City Cowboys (NL) players
Syracuse Stars (AA) players
Washington Statesmen players
Terre Haute (minor league baseball) players
Indianapolis Hoosiers (minor league) players
Hamilton Hams players
Syracuse Stars (minor league baseball) players
Troy Trojans (minor league) players
Marinette Badgers players
Evansville Hoosiers players
Baseball players from Kentucky
People from Garrard County, Kentucky
Male murder victims
American police officers killed in the line of duty
Deaths by firearm in Kentucky
People murdered in Kentucky